Paharpur Tehsil is a tehsil located in Dera Ismail Khan District, Khyber Pakhtunkhwa, Pakistan.

The tehsil is administratively subdivided into 18 union councils with headquarters at Paharpur.

References

Populated places in Dera Ismail Khan District
Tehsils of Khyber Pakhtunkhwa

Muhammad kashan